Crazy Cavan 'n' the Rhythm Rockers (also known as Crazy Cavan and the Rhythm Rockers,  Cavan & The Rhythm Rockers, Crazy Cavan & The Rhythm Rockers) were a Welsh rockabilly band associated with the Teddy Boy scene. The band formed in 1970, and were still actively touring and recording before frontman Cavan Grogan's death in 2020.

The band appeared in the 1980 film Blue Suede Shoes, which detailed the revival of 1950s rock and roll music scene at the time.

History
The first incarnation of the band was formed in Newport, South Wales, in 1964 by Cavan Grogan (vocals), Lyndon Needs (lead guitar) and Terry Walley (rhythm guitar) under the name "Screamin' Count Dracula and the Vampires".

In 1968, joined by Brian Thomas (piano) and Don Kinsella (bass), they took the name "The Sundogs" which they borrowed from Alan Freed who was known as "Moondog" and combined it with their taste for Sun Records, a record label whose releases which they used to buy at that time. Then in 1970, with the addition of Mike Coffey (drums), they took the name "Crazy Cavan 'n' the Rhythm Rockers", a name which has endured.

In 1973, the band formed its own record label, Crazy Rhythm Records (named after their own description of their music) and released their debut single, "Teddy Boy Boogie" (backed with "Bop Little Baby"). In 1975, they released their first album Crazy Rhythm on the Dutch Rockhouse label. In 1976, they signed with Charly Records in the UK, and released their second album, Rockability.  The band continued to play live, their final performance being at the Annual Rockers Reunion in Reading on 18 January 2020.

Cavan Grogan died on 15 February 2020, aged 70.  He left three children and three grandchildren.

Discography

LPs
{| class="wikitable"
! Year
! Album
! Label
! Notes
|-
| 1975  
| Crazy Rhythm 
| Rockhouse
| Re-released in 1981 by Charly
|-
| 1976  
| Rockability  
| Charly
|
|-
| 1977  
| Our Own Way of Rockin''' 
| Charly
| 
|-
| 1978  
| Live at the Rainbow 
| Charly
| 
|-
| 1979  
| Red Hot 'N' Rockabilly  
| Charly
| 
|-
| 1979  
| Still Crazy 
| Crazy Rhythm 
| Re-released in 1981 as Mr. Cool by Charly
|-
| 1981  
| Cool and Crazy Rock-a-billy 
| Big Beat/Polarvox
| 
|-
| 1981  
| Teddy Jive 
| Charly
|
|-
| 1982  
| Hey Teenager! 
| Big Beat
| 
|-
| 1983  
| Live at Pickett's Lock 
| Charly 
| Reissued on CD in 2003 by Teddy Boy Power
|-
| 1984  
| Rollin' Through The Night 
| Big Beat/Virgin 
| Reissued on CD in 1999 by Crazy Rhythm
|-
| 1989  
| Rough Tough 'N' Ready 
| Crazy Rhythm 
| Also on CD
|-
| 1990  
| Crazy Times 
| Instant 
| Also on CD
|-
| 1996  
| It's Wild, It's Weird, It's Crazy 
| Crazy Rhythm
| Also on CD
|-
| 2012  
| Rollin 'n' Rockin 
| Goofin
| Also on CD by Crazy Rhythm
|}

CDs

Contemporary influences

Zombie Ghost Train included a cover of "Teddy Boy Boogie", on their Dealing The Death Card album.
Singer Sparky Phillips from Demented Are Go recorded with Hillbilly Moon Explosion a version of "Teddy Boy Flick Knife Rock'n'Roll", on the album The Sparky Sessions.  He has previously stated that he was influenced by Crazy Cavan in his early days.
Klingonz covered "Trouble Trouble" on their Still Stompin'' album.

Further reading

References

External links
Crazycavan.com
Crazy Cavan Fan Club

Rockabilly music groups
Welsh rock music groups
Musical groups established in 1970
Musical groups disestablished in 2020
British rock and roll music groups